Brachauchenius (meaning 'short neck') is an extinct genus of pliosaurid that lived in North America (United States) and Morocco during the Late Cretaceous.

History
 
The type species, Brachauchenius lucasi, lived in the Western Inland Sea of North America around 100.5-89.3 million years ago, from the Cenomonian to the Turonian of the Cretaceous. An older specimen from the Barremian of Colombia was considered as part of this genus, representing the first re-occurrence of the non-rhomaleosaurid pliosaurs after a Berriasian-Hauterivian hiatus. However, subsequent analysis of this Colombian specimen shows that it was enough distinctive to warrant a new genus and species, named as Stenorhynchosaurus munozi.

The first known (type) specimen (USNM 4989) was collected by Charles Hazelius Sternberg from Ottawa County, Kansas in 1884. The species was named by Samuel W. Williston. Brachauchenius represents the last known occurrence of a pliosaur in North America.

A larger specimen (FHSM VP-321 - skull length 170 cm) was collected by George Fryer Sternberg in 1952 from the Fairport Chalk of Russell County, Kansas, and later described by Carpenter. Schumacher and Everhart (2005) reported on the age and locality of both Kansas specimens. This specimen is now reassigned to its own genus and species, Megacephalosaurus eulerti.

In 2013, Benson et al. referred a partial cranium from the Chalk Group of England (previously referred to Polyptychodon) to Brachauchenius indet.

In 2015, a pliosaur mandible from Turonian deposits near Goulmima, Morocco were referred to the species Brachauchenius lucasi

Classification

The cladogram below follows a 2011 analysis by paleontologists Hilary F. Ketchum and Roger B. J. Benson, and reduced to genera only.

See also

 List of plesiosaur genera
 Timeline of plesiosaur research

References

External links
 Oceans of Kansas Paleontology

Late Cretaceous plesiosaurs of North America
Fossil taxa described in 1903
Pliosaurids
Turonian genus extinctions
Taxa named by Samuel Wendell Williston
Sauropterygian genera